Christ Child Blessing is a 1455-1460 tempera on panel painting by Andrea Mantegna. It is now in the National Gallery of Art.

It is attributed to his young period in Padua. It is first recorded in 1901, when it was in the collection of Sir Francis Cook at Richmond, Surrey. It passed to his descendants before being auctioned in London in 1947, when it was bought by Alessandro Contini-Bonacossi. Contini-Bonacossi sold it to the Samuel H. Kress Foundation in 1948. It was given to its present owner in 1952.

External links
https://web.archive.org/web/20090507052645/http://www.nga.gov/fcgi-bin/tinfo_f?object=41682

1460 paintings
Paintings by Andrea Mantegna
Collections of the National Gallery of Art